The Pomilio PE was a First World War Italian armed reconnaissance biplane designed and built by the Pomilio brothers. It was developed from the earlier Pomilio PC and PD.

Development
The Pomilio brothers first armed reconnaissance biplane was the Pomilio PC which appeared in 1917. It was a conventional biplane of mixed construction with a fixed tailskid landing gear. It had two open cockpits in tandem and was powered by a nose-mounted 260 hp (194 kW) Fiat A.12 engine. It first entered service in 1917 and was found to dangerously unstable which led to an improved design the Pomilio PD. Only some 70 Pomilio PC were made for Italian Air Force. Apart from other improvements, the PD introduced a tail fin and a ventral fin to help with the stability. The cylinder heads were exposed, and a radiator was placed in front of an upper wing. The PD was flown in June 1917. 431 PD were manufactured, including 93 dual control trainers, which were needed due to difficult flight characteristics.

A further improvement was the Pomilio PE, fitted with a more powerful variant of the Fiat A.12bis. It had a fully cowled engine, with a vertical radiator in front of it, what changed the plane's appearance. On later machines, a triangular fin was replaced with a bigger trapezoid one. It entered production in October 1917, and 984 were made, including 103 trainers. Changes were made throughout the production run with later aircraft fitted with synchronized forward-firing machine-guns as well as observer's Lewis gun.

Variants
Pomilio PC
Initial production variant
Pomilio PD
Modified production variant with new tail unit and ventral fin, 575 PC and PDs built.
Pomilio PE
Improved production variant with more powerful fully cowled engine, 984 built.

Operators

Corpo Aeronautico Militare
Regia Aeronautica

Specifications (PE)

References

Bibliography

PE
1910s Italian military reconnaissance aircraft
Military aircraft of World War I
Single-engined tractor aircraft
Biplanes
Aircraft first flown in 1917